Anika Goss-Foster is a nonprofit leader from Detroit, Michigan. She is the executive director of the nonprofit organization Detroit Future City, which redevelops vacant properties in Detroit.

Biography 
Anika has a master's degree from the University of Michigan for social work in community organizing. She has a bachelor's degree from Purdue University for sociology and African-American studies. Goss-Foster joined the Local Initiatives Support Corporation (LISC) in 1999 and worked there for 15 years before joining Future City Detroit. A report by the Black Worker Initiative at the Institute for Policy Studies featured Goss-Foster for her contributions to improving Detroit. She has spoken out against modern segregation.

Detroit Future City 
Goss-Foster is an executive director of the nonprofit organization Detroit Future City. Detroit Future City works in Detroit to redevelop blighted properties with the goal of ensuring all residents have a say in city planning. Detroit Future City in 2017 announced they would focus on redeveloping or otherwise dealing with the approximately 900 vacant industrial sites in Detroit.

References 

1971 births
Living people
American nonprofit chief executives
Women nonprofit executives
Purdue University alumni
University of Michigan School of Social Work alumni
People from Detroit
American women chief executives
21st-century American women